Dolichognatha lodiculafaciens is a species of spider in the family Tetragnathidae, found in Guyana.

References

Tetragnathidae
Spiders of South America
Spiders described in 1932